Vive was a six-part a cappella group from England, United Kingdom.

Consisting of a line-up of five men and a woman (bass, baritone, two tenors, male alto and soprano), it builds upon the contemporary a cappella sound, taking inspiration from Take 6 and The Real Group.

They won the final of The Voice Festival UK 2013 and were presented with the Ward Swingle Award for outstanding originality, outstanding musicality and also best arrangement.

The group disbanded in late 2014.

Members
Lewis Daniel (Bass)
James Rose (Founder, Baritone, Composer, Arranger)
Martynas Vilpisauskas (Tenor 2)
Ben Cox (Tenor 1)
Sam Robson (Alto, Composer, Arranger)
Emily Dankworth (Soprano)
Sam Merrick (Sound Engineer 2012-Nov 2014)(Manager/Artist Liaison - 2012-Nov 2013)

Broadcasting appearances

Television
The One Show, BBC One [Wednesday 20 March 2013, 7pm (GMT)]

Radio
Ronnie Scott's Radio Show, Jazz FM (UK)/ Jazz.FM91 (CA) [12/13 January 2013]
Inspirit with Jumoke Fashola, BBC London 94.9 [Sunday 20 January 2013, 8.15am (GMT)]
The Choir with Aled Jones, BBC Radio 3 [Sunday 20 January 2013, 5pm (GMT)]
Ronnie Scott's Radio Show, Jazz FM (UK)/ Jazz.FM91 (CA) [23/24 March 2013]
The Paul O'Grady Show, BBC Radio 2 [Sunday 7 April 2013]
The Choir with Clare Wheeler, BBC Radio 3 [Sunday 28 April 2013, 5pm (GMT)]

References

A cappella musical groups
British vocal groups
Musical groups established in 2012
Musical groups disestablished in 2014
2012 establishments in England